Winwick is a village and civil parish in the Borough of Warrington in Cheshire, England, north of the town of Warrington.  It contains 16 buildings that are recorded in the National Heritage List for England as designated listed buildings.   The parish is partly residential and partly rural.  The listed buildings include two churches, a holy well, two milestones, and a mounting block.  The other structures are houses, farms, or buildings related to them.

Key

Buildings

References

Citations

Sources

Listed buildings in Warrington
Lists of listed buildings in Cheshire